The Circle is a 2017 American techno-thriller film directed by James Ponsoldt with a screenplay by Ponsoldt and Dave Eggers, based on Eggers' 2013 novel of the same name. The film stars Emma Watson and Tom Hanks, as well as John Boyega, Karen Gillan, Ellar Coltrane, Patton Oswalt, Glenne Headly, and Bill Paxton. This would mark a posthumous release for Paxton, who died in February 2017, and would also be the final film of Headly's released before her death in June 2017.

The film premiered at the Tribeca Film Festival on April 26, 2017, and was theatrically released on April 28, 2017, by STXfilms and EuropaCorp. It received negative reviews but grossed $40 million worldwide against a budget of $18 million, becoming director Ponsoldt's highest grossing feature.

Plot
Through her friend Annie (Karen Gillan), call center intern Mae Holland (Emma Watson) secures a customer support position at The Circle, a tech and social media company. Mae's long time friend Mercer (Ellar Coltrane) is less supportive. Mae takes the job, hoping to support her parents, particularly her father who suffers from multiple sclerosis. At a company meeting, CEO Eamon Bailey (Tom Hanks) introduces SeeChange, which uses small cameras placed anywhere to provide real-time high-quality video. Mae rises quickly in The Circle, embracing social networking and meeting Ty Lafitte (John Boyega), who displays suspicion of other, more enthusiastic employees. At an outdoor company rally emphasizing the need for accountability in politics, The Circle's Chief Operating Officer, Tom Stenton (Patton Oswalt), introduces Congresswoman Olivia Santos (Judy Reyes), who has agreed to open her daily workings to the public through SeeChange. Ty subsequently shows Mae the area containing the cloud server where all information collected by SeeChange is to be stored. Mae is embarrassed when she realizes that Ty is the creator of TrueYou, the Circle's social network, and she had not recognized him. He tells her that TrueYou has grown out of his control, and its current utilization is not what he intended.

Later, Mae's mother shows Mae a picture of a chandelier Mercer made from deer antlers. She photographs it and shares it on her Circle profile. The image attracts significant negative attention to Mercer, with people accusing him of killing the deer. Mercer confronts her at work and tells her to leave him alone. Distressed by Mercer’s reaction, Mae goes kayaking at night and the rough waters cause her kayak to capsize, requiring rescue by the Coast Guard, who were alerted to the emergency through SeeChange cameras, which recorded her acquiring the kayak and capsizing it. At the next meeting, Eamon introduces Mae to the crowd and they discuss her experience of the rescue, which moves her to become the first "Circler" to go "completely transparent", which involves wearing a small camera and exposing her life to the world 24 hours a day. However, this damages her relationships with her parents and Annie, as she accidentally exposes private aspects of their lives to the camera, and they distance themselves from her as a result.

At a board meeting, Eamon announces support from almost all 50 states for voting through Circle accounts. Mae takes it a step further, and suggests requiring every voting citizen to have a Circle account in order to do so. Eamon and Tom approve, but the suggestion upsets Annie. At the next company-wide meeting, Mae says that The Circle believes it can find anyone on the planet in under 20 minutes and introduces a program to find wanted felons in the same time frame. The program identifies an escaped child murderer within 10 minutes, which prompts the Circlers in the audience to erupt in applause. Mae uses this successful test to suggest transparency can be a force for good. Mae says that the program can find anyone, not just wanted felons, and someone suggests Mercer. Mae is initially hesitant to use the program to locate Mercer, but Tom persuades Mae to continue. Mercer is quickly located in an isolated cabin. Startled by Circle users descending upon his home, he flees in a car, though a Circle user places a small camera on his car window without his knowledge or consent. They pursue him via automobile and a flying drone, which causes Mercer to swerve uncontrollably off a bridge to his death, much to Mae's horror. Days later, Mae calls Annie, who has left The Circle and returned to Scotland, which has improved her well-being. Mae, however, finds that connection with others helps her cope with Mercer's death.

Mae returns to The Circle, despite her parents' pleas. Mae calls Ty to ask for a favor and Ty tells her something that he has discovered. At the next company-wide meeting, Mae explains how connection has helped her recover. She speaks with Eamon, and invites Tom onstage, then invites Eamon and Tom to go fully transparent. She explains that Ty has found all their email accounts and exposed them to the world, as no one should be exempt. Eamon and Tom, clearly upset, try to save face before Tom leaves the stage. Her superiors cut power to her presentation, and the stage goes dark, but the audience activates their mobile devices, illuminating Mae, who reiterates her advocacy of transparency. She later returns to kayaking, untroubled by the drones that shadow her.

Cast
 Emma Watson as Mae Holland
 Tom Hanks as Eamon Bailey
 John Boyega as Ty Lafitte
 Karen Gillan as Annie Allerton
 Ellar Coltrane as Mercer Regalado
 Patton Oswalt as Tom Stenton
 Bill Paxton as Vinnie Holland, Mae's father
 Glenne Headly as Bonnie Holland, Mae's mother
 Nate Corddry as Dan
 Mamoudou Athie as Jared
 Jimmy Wong as Mitch
 Ellen Wong as Renata
 Smith Cho as Gina
 Poorna Jagannathan as Dr. Jessica Villalobos
 Judy Reyes as Congresswoman Olivia Santos
 Eve Gordon as Senator Williamson
 Beck as himself
 Claudia O’Doherty as High Powered Circler

Production

Casting and financing
On December 15, 2014, Deadline reported that Tom Hanks would star in a film adaptation of Dave Eggers' 2013 novel The Circle, with James Ponsoldt writing and directing. In January 2015, THR confirmed that Anthony Bregman would produce the film through his banner, Likely Story, along with Ponsoldt, Hanks, and Gary Goetzman. On May 11, 2015, it was announced that Image Nation Abu Dhabi would fully finance the film, together with Walter Parkes and Laurie MacDonald, while IM Global would handle international sales. IM GLOBAL later sold the rights to various distributors. In June 2015, Emma Watson was officially set to play the lead role of Mae Holland in the film. In August 2015, John Boyega was added to the cast. In September 2015, Karen Gillan, Patton Oswalt, Bill Paxton, and Ellar Coltrane joined the cast.

Filming
Principal photography on the film began on September 11, 2015, in Los Angeles, California. On September 17, filming was taking place in Pasadena. Reshoots were done in January 2017.

Release
In February 2016, EuropaCorp acquired the North American distribution rights to the film, while STX Entertainment co-distributes. The Circle premiered at the Tribeca Film Festival on April 26, 2017 and was theatrically released on April 28, 2017.

There has not been an official Region 2 UK DVD or Blu-ray release. The movie however, has been released in the US, and in some European countries, including Germany.

Reception

Box office
The Circle grossed $20.5 million in the United States and Canada and $20.1 million in other territories, for a total of $40.6 million, against a production budget of $18 million.

In the United States and Canada, the film was released alongside How to Be a Latin Lover, Baahubali 2: The Conclusion and Sleight, and was projected to gross $10–12 million from 3,163 theaters during its opening weekend. However, the film underperformed, debuting at number five with $9 million, behind The Fate of the Furious, How to Be a Latin Lover, Baahubali 2: The Conclusion and The Boss Baby.

Critical response
On review aggregator Rotten Tomatoes, the film holds an approval rating of 15% based on 144 reviews, with an average rating of 4.20/10. The website's critical consensus reads, "The Circle assembles an impressive cast, but this digitally driven thriller spins aimlessly in its half-hearted exploration of timely themes." On Metacritic, the film holds a score of 43 out of 100, based on 32 critics, indicating "mixed or average reviews". Audiences polled by CinemaScore gave the film an average grade of "D+" on an A+ to F scale.

Glenn Kenny of The New York Times criticized the film for its repetitiveness and lack of originality: "The novel is at its most trenchantly funny when depicting the exhausting nature of virtual social life, and it's in this area, too, that the movie gets its very few knowing laughs. But it's plain, not much more than 15 minutes in, that without the story's paranoid aspects you're left with a conceptual framework that's been lapped three times over by the likes of, say, the Joshua Cohen novel Book of Numbers or the HBO comedy series Silicon Valley." Dan Callahan of TheWrap wrote: "The main problem with The Circle is that the evil of the tech company is made so obvious right from the start."

Eric Kohn of IndieWire awarded the film a C. He was especially critical of the film's tonal inconsistencies: "Recent years have seen a proliferation of deep-dive narratives on the information age, from the psychological thriller territory of Mr. Robot to the parodic extremes of Silicon Valley. Ponsoldt's project is stuck in between those two extremes. On the one hand, it's an Orwellian drama about surveillance society; at the same time, it's a sincere workplace drama about young adulthood that shoehorns in some techno-babble for the sake of deepening its potential."

Gregory Wakeman of Cinema Blend panned the film, arguing that "the movie's grand philosophical debate is so simplistic and comes from two opposing and extreme sides of the spectrum that it's basically rendered mute." He also wrote: "Smug, condescending, and completely without incident, The Circle is the reason why people hate Hollywood." Wakeman gave the film one-and-a-half stars out of five. Likewise, Peter Travers of Rolling Stone awarded the film one star out of four. He wrote: "The Circle feels dull, dated and ripped from yesterday's headlines. It flatlines while you're watching it."

In a positive review, John DeFore of The Hollywood Reporter wrote: "The film's final message isn't as difficult to grapple with as the world we're actually living in, but that doesn't make it easy." He also described the film as "a mainstream-friendly critique of social media." Owen Gleiberman of Variety was positive as well, directing much of his praise towards the film's contemporary relevance: "You could call The Circle a dystopian thriller, yet it's not the usual boilerplate sci-fi about grimly abstract oppressors lording it over everyone else. The movie is smarter and creepier than that; it's a cautionary tale for the age of social-media witch hunts and compulsive oversharing. The fascist digital future the movie imagines is darkly intriguing to contemplate, because one's main thought about it is how much of that future is already here." Mick LaSalle of the San Francisco Chronicle also praised the film's timeliness: "What makes The Circle so valuable is not only that it's showing us a ghastly possible path that the world may take, but that it articulates the mentality that could create and sustain it."

References

External links

 
 
 

2010s science fiction drama films
2017 films
American science fiction drama films
American thriller films
Films about the Internet
Films about social media
Government by algorithm in fiction
Films based on American novels
Films based on science fiction novels
Films directed by James Ponsoldt
Films produced by Gary Goetzman
Films produced by Tom Hanks
Films scored by Danny Elfman
Films set in Europe
Films set in San Francisco
Films set on islands
Films shot in Los Angeles
Playtone films
Techno-thriller films
Films based on works by Dave Eggers
STX Entertainment films
EuropaCorp films
Films about multiple sclerosis
2017 drama films
2010s English-language films
2010s American films
Films about companies
Drone films